Dongjiao Subdistrict is a subdistrict of Xinhua District, in the heart of Shijiazhuang, Hebei, People's Republic of China. , it has 6 residential communities and 1 village under its administration.

See also
List of township-level divisions of Hebei

References

Township-level divisions of Hebei